Maytablı (also, Mahtablı, Meytablı, Meytabli, and Meytably) is a village in the Davachi Rayon of Azerbaijan.  The village forms part of the municipality of Rəhimli.

References 

Populated places in Shabran District